Caricia is an Internet radio station on Sirius XM Radio channel 762. Their format focuses on love ballads spanning from the 1950s to the 1980s in both English and Spanish.

History
The channel had been removed from the satellite lineup on February 2, 2004 but was relaunched on January 2, 2008. Caricia initially played a mixture of Spanish oldies from artists such as Julio Iglesias, Camilo Sesto, José José, Jose Feliciano, Leo Dan, etc. In addition, the channel is available only to DirecTV subscribers who subscribe to the Spanish language programming package.

This channel was programmed by Hispanic Broadcasting Corporation until it merged with Univision Radio in 2002. Univision Radio programmed the channel until 2004, when channel production turned in-house.  In 2004, the channel was removed from satellite lineup and was only on the DirecTV service.  The format before the channel returned to the satellite service was Spanish AC. The channel returned to the satellite service on January 1, 2008.  On November 12, 2008, resulting from the Sirius/XM merger, Caricia was removed from the XM lineup.

As of 2020, the station streams on Sirius XM Radio channel 762.

See also
XM Satellite Radio channel history

References

Internet radio stations in the United States
Radio stations established in 2001
Internet radio stations in Canada
Sirius XM Radio channels